This article contains an overview of the year 1985 in the sport of athletics.

International Events
 African Championships
 Asian Championships
 Balkan Games
 Bolivarian Games
 Central American and Caribbean Championships
 European Indoor Championships
 South American Championships
 Pan Arab Games
 World Cross Country Championships
 World Cup
 World Indoor Games
 World Student Games

World records

Men

Women

Men's Best Year Performers

100 metres

200 metres

400 metres

800 metres

1,500 metres

Mile

3,000 metres

5,000 metres

10,000 metres

Half Marathon

110m Hurdles

400m Hurdles

3,000m Steeplechase

High Jump

Long Jump

Triple Jump

Discus

Hammer

Shot Put

Javelin (old design)

Pole Vault

Decathlon

Women's Best Year Performers

100 metres

200 metres

400 metres

800 metres

1,500 metres

Mile

3,000 metres

5,000 metres

10,000 metres

Half Marathon

100m Hurdles

400m Hurdles

High Jump

Long Jump

Shot Put

Discus

Javelin (old design)

Heptathlon

Marathon

Year Rankings

Men

Women

National Champions

Road races

Births
 January 4 — Antar Zerguelaïne, Algerian middle distance runner
 January 4 — Nataliya Zolotukhina, Ukrainian hammer thrower
 January 6 — Nick Owens, American hammer thrower
 February 10 — Mariya Smolyachkova, Belarusian hammer thrower
 March 2 — Patrick Makau Musyoki, Kenyan distance runner
 March 16 — Olexiy Sokyrskiyy, Ukrainian hammer thrower
 March 19 — Sean Wroe, Australian sprinter
 March 21 — Vladimir Kanaykin, Russian race walker
 March 25 — Wilfried Bingangoye, Gabonese sprinter
 April 6 — Anna Avdeyeva, Russian shot putter
 April 7 — James Rendón, Colombian race walker
 April 18 — Musa Amer Obaid, Kenyan-Qatari middle distance runner
 May 4 — Henry Sugut, Kenyan long-distance runner
 May 5 — Gu Junjie, Chinese triple jumper
 May 21 — Mohsen El Anany, Egyptian hammer thrower
 May 26 — Irina Petrova, Russian race walker
 May 27 — Karina Vnukova, Lithuanian high jumper
 May 31 — Kim Hyun-Sub, South Korean race walker
 June 1 — Tirunesh Dibaba, Ethiopian long-distance runner
 June 3 — Samwel Mwera, Tanzanian middle distance runner 
 June 15 — Susan McKelvie, Scottish hammer thrower
 June 17 — Ozge Gurler, Turkish athlete
 June 21 — Ryoko Kizaki, Japanese long-distance runner
 July 29 — Anja Pollmächer, German sprinter
 July 31 — Brimin Kipruto, Kenyan middle distance runner
 August 26 — Oleksiy Kasyanov, Ukrainian decathlete
 September 17 — Tracy-Ann Rowe, Jamaican sprinter
 October 12 — Boniface Kiprop Toroitich, Ugandan athlete
 November 14 — Andrey Krivov, Russian race walker
 November 16 — Rogério Bispo, Brazilian long jumper
 November 18 — Allyson Felix, American sprinter
 December 1 — Andretti Bain, Bahamian sprinter
 December 8 — Kim Deok-Hyeon, South Korean triple jumper
 December 20 — Gilbert Kirwa, Kenyan marathon runner
 December 26 — Carol Rodríguez, Puerto Rican sprinter

Deaths
 March 4 — Sverre Strandli (59), Norwegian hammer thrower (b. 1925)
 June 15 — Andy Stanfield (67), American athlete (b. 1927)
 October 30 — Edgar Bruun (80), Norwegian race walker (b. 1905)

References
 Year Lists
 Association of Road Racing Statisticians
 1985 Year Rankings

 
Athletics (track and field) by year